Witch Egg is the debut album by Witch Egg, a side project of Osees' John Dwyer. The album was released on January 22, 2021, via Rock Is Hell Records.

Background
Witch Egg was announced in November 2020 along with lead single "Greener Pools", accompanied by a statement that the album was "an improvised set of songs by John Dwyer, Nick Murray, Brad Caulkins, Greg Coates & Tom Dolas", and was "recorded and mixed at Stu-Stu-Studio by John Dwyer." This was followed by the release date announcement and release of second single "City Maggot" in December.

Critical reception

Pitchfork called the album "an instrumental jazz-garage chimera that's far-out enough to escape predictability and ghoulish enough to go bump in the night." Echoes and Dust called the album "really good", saying, "Water is not limitless. Yet the creative well of Dwyer seems never-ending." Everything Is Noise wrote, "The entire aesthetic on the surface comes across quite heavily and clearly throughout the music. Normally, I tend to accent how an album starts and ends in order to underline what I otherwise refer to as its narrative quality. This isn’t an album that relies on such an aspect, nor would it care to unfold itself using any kind of frame which could limit it in any way. This is a record which, I feel, goes out of its way to go somewhere and take us with it. I’m not sure where 'somewhere' is or what it looks like, but it sounds like the contents which we are acquainted with over the course of Witch Egg." Mxdwn.com wrote, "Recently, the less imaginative among us have declared rock music to be dead. Rock music has certainly fallen from its commercial pinnacle, and may now just be another genre in a sea of genres, but guitar-driven music still has gas left in the tank. Look no further than Witch Egg's self-titled record for evidence. It explores the boundaries of both rock and jazz with such frenzied delight that it will whizz by all but the most open-minded of listeners."

Track listing

Personnel

Witch Egg
John Dwyer – synthesizers, guitar, electric bass, hand percussion, flute, mellotron, tapes, effects
Nick Murray – drums, percussion
Brad Caulkins – saxophones
Tom Dolas – Wurlitzer piano, clavinet
Greg Coates – stand-up bass

Production and design
John Dwyer – recording, mixing, editing
JJ Golden – mastering
Dylan McConnell – cover art
Brian Bamps – typography
Jochen – layout

References

External links
 Witch Egg on Discogs 

2021 debut albums
Jazz albums by American artists
Psychedelic music albums by American artists
Garage rock albums by American artists
Garage punk albums
Rock albums by American artists
Funk albums by American artists
Ambient albums by American artists